Patricia Yurena Rodríguez Alonso (born 6 March 1990) is a Spanish model, actress, and beauty pageant titleholder who was crowned Miss Spain 2008 and then Miss Universe Spain 2013. She represented Spain at Miss World 2008, where she placed in the top fifteen, and at Miss Universe 2013, where she was the first runner-up, becoming the highest-placing Spanish delegate since Teresa Sánchez López was first runner-up at Miss Universe 1985, and after Amparo Muñoz won the title in  1974.

In August 2014, during the end of her reign as Miss Universe Spain, Rodríguez revealed she was in a relationship with a woman through her Instagram, becoming the first out LGBT woman to hold a major national pageant title. Although she was not out while competing, Rodríguez is the second out LGBT woman to compete in a major international beauty pageant, following Julia Lemigova, who represented the Soviet Union at Miss Universe 1991. In February 2021, Rodríguez confirmed her pansexuality and that she was currently in a relationship with a man, saying that "love does not understand gender".

Early life
Rodríguez was born in Granadilla de Abona on the island of Tenerife within the Canary Islands of Spain. She began modeling professionally as a teenager.

Pageantry

Miss Spain 2008
In March 2008, Rodríguez represented Tenerife at Miss Spain 2008. She advanced from the initial group of 52 entrants to the top twenty, then top twelve, and ultimately the top six. After entering the top six, Rodríguez went on to win the title. As Miss Spain, Rodríguez was to represent Spain at Miss Universe 2008; however, Miss Universe rules stipulated that all entrants must have turned 18 by 1 February of the year of the contest, while Rodríguez had only turned 18 that March. After being declared illegible due to her age, Rodríguez was selected to compete at Miss World 2008 instead, while her first runner-up Claudia Moro was selected to represent Spain at Miss Universe.

Later that year, Rodríguez arrived in Johannesburg to represent Spain at Miss World 2008. Of the initial 109 delegates, she advanced to the top fifteen, but did not make it to the top five. Ksenia Sukhinova of Russia was ultimately crowned the winner.

Miss Universe Spain 2013
The Miss Spain Organization held the Spanish license for Miss Universe, so for years Rodríguez was ineligible to compete again in the hope of representing Spain at Miss Universe. However, in 2013, the organization was split into two separate organizations: Miss World Spain and Miss Universe Spain. Rodríguez was selected as one of the twelve delegates at the inaugural Miss Universe Spain 2013 competition, held in Madrid. She advanced to the top six, where she ultimately was crowned the winner.

As Miss Universe Spain, Rodríguez was given the right to represent Spain at the Miss Universe 2013 competition in Moscow. She went on to receive immense success at Miss Universe, advancing from the initial 86 delegates to the top sixteen, top ten, top five, and ultimately placed as the first runner-up behind Gabriela Isler of Venezuela. This was the best result Spain had received in the competition since Teresa Sánchez López was 1st Runner-Up at Miss Universe 1985.

Miss Universe 2013
Rodríguez represented Spain at Miss Universe 2013 on 9 November 2013, finishing as 1st runner-up to María Gabriela Isler of Venezuela, her roommate during the competition. She is the second Spanish woman to place 1st runner-up in the Miss Universe competition (the first one was Teresa Sánchez López in 1985). She is also only one of seven former Miss World semifinalists to place in the Miss Universe semifinals, the others being Michelle McLean of Namibia in 1992, Christine Straw of Jamaica in 2004, Ada de la Cruz of the Dominican Republic in 2009, Yendi Phillips also of Jamaica in 2010, Catriona Gray of the Philippines in 2018, Julia Gama of Brazil in 2020, and Andrea Meza of Mexico in 2020 (coincidentally Rodriguez, de la Cruz, Phillips, and Gama all finished as 1st Runner-Up).

Personal life
In August 2014, Rodríguez publicized her romantic relationship with Spanish DJ Vanesa Klein through her Instagram account. This revelation sparked international headlines referring to Rodríguez as a lesbian, with Rodríguez becoming the first major national pageant titleholder to be out as LGBT, and the second woman out as LGBT to have competed in one of the major international beauty pageants, following Julia Lemigova, who represented the Soviet Union at Miss Universe 1991.

In February 2021, Rodríguez said that she was in a relationship with a man, saying that "love does not understand gender", confirming her pansexuality.

Filmography

References

External links

 

Official Miss España website - Past titleholders

1990 births
21st-century Spanish actresses
Spanish LGBT actors
LGBT models
Living people
Miss Spain winners
Miss Universe 2013 contestants
Miss World 2008 delegates
Pansexual actresses
People from Tenerife
Spanish beauty pageant winners
Spanish female models
Spanish film actresses